Rear Guard is a horizontally scrolling shooter written for the Atari 8-bit family and released in December 1981 by Adventure International. Neil Larimer created the game with assistance from Sparky Starks. It was ported to the Apple II, TRS-80, and TRS-80 Color Computer.

Gameplay

Reception
The game sold 3,400 copies by June 1982, appearing on Computer Gaming Worlds list of top sellers. David H. Ahl of Creative Computing Video & Arcade Games said in 1983 that "to maintain your sanity, a joystick is necessary" for the Apple version of Rear Guard. He concluded that it was "a fast-moving colorful game that brings Defender home to the Apple".

In March 1983 Rear Guard won Softlines Dog of the Year award "for badness in computer games", Atari division, based on reader submissions. The magazine reported that although the Apple version was "just fine", "According to the ballots, Rear Guard [for the Atari] was bad beyond belief.".

References

External links
Rear Guard at Atari Mania

1981 video games
Adventure International games
Apple II games
Atari 8-bit family games
TRS-80 games
TRS-80 Color Computer games
Horizontally scrolling shooters
Video games developed in the United States